Antoine Cabaton (11 December 1863 – 25 November 1942) was a French philologist, one of the founders of the insulindian studies. Besides his teaching duties, his researches and publications were devoted not only to language but also religion, history and contemporary issues.

Bibliography 
1901: Nouvelles recherches sur les Chams
1906: Dictionnaire cam-français, with Étienne Aymonier, École française d'Extrême-Orient
1909: Les Indes néerlandaises, translated into English as soon as 1911
1912: Catalogue sommaire des manuscrits indiens, indo-chinois et malayopolynésiens de la Bibliothèque nationale
1922: Participation to the L'Encyclopédie de l'Islam
 numerous articles in the Revue du monde musulman from 1906 to 1926, for example :
 Notes de bibliographie indo-néerlandaise, 
 Les Moros de Soulou et de Mindanao, 
 Un congrès de jeunes Javanais, 
 Les Malais et l'avenir de leur langue.

External links 
 Un grand précurseur : Antoine Cabaton (1863-1942) by Denys Lombard in Archipel. Volume 26, 1983. p. 17-24.

People from Cher (department)
1863 births
1942 deaths
Linguists from France
Indonesianists
French anthropologists
French orientalists
École du Louvre alumni
Members of the Société Asiatique
Chevaliers of the Légion d'honneur